Hangul Jamo is a Unicode block containing positional (choseong, jungseong, and jongseong) forms of the Hangul consonant and vowel clusters. While the Hangul Syllables Unicode block contains precomposed syllables used in standard modern Korean, the Hangul Jamo block can be used to compose arbitrary syllables dynamically including those not included in the Hangul Syllables block.

Block

History
The following Unicode-related documents record the purpose and process of defining specific characters in the Hangul Jamo block:

References

See also 
 Hangul Jamo Extended-A
 Hangul Jamo Extended-B
 CJK Symbols and Punctuation (Unicode block)
 Enclosed CJK Letters and Months (Unicode block)

Unicode blocks
(Unicode block)